The 1982 World Cup took place 2–5 December 1982 at Pierre Marques Golf Club in Acapulco, Mexico. It was the 29th World Cup event. The previous World Cup was played in 1980, since the 1981 event was cancelled. The tournament was a 72-hole stroke play team event with 31 teams. Each team consisted of two players from a country. The combined score of each team determined the team results. The Spain team of José María Cañizares and Manuel Piñero won by three strokes over the United States team of Bobby Clampett and Bob Gilder. It was the third Spanish victory in the last six World Cup tournaments. The individual competition for The International Trophy, was won by Pinero one stroke ahead of Canizares and Gilder.

Teams

Scores 
Team

International Trophy

Sources:

References

World Cup (men's golf)
Golf tournaments in Mexico
Sport in Guerrero
World Cup
World Cup golf
World Cup golf
World Cup golf